California Dreamin' (endless) is a 2007 Romanian film by Cristian Nemescu. It won the Prix un certain regard at the 2007 Cannes Film Festival. It also picked up the Iris Award for Best Film, the Audience Award and the Canvas Award at the Brussels European Film Festival 2007. The film is also sometimes called Endless in English, nesfârșit being Romanian for "endless".

The director died before editing was completed. MediaPro Studios decided to edit the film with the entirety of the material left by Nemescu, a decision which led to the considerable runtime of 155 minutes.

Plot

The plot is based on a true story: in 1999, during the NATO bombing of Yugoslavia, a train containing American radar equipment required in Kosovo, guarded by a small troop of American and Romanian soldiers, went through Romania and was stopped for four days in a small village in Oltenia because some customs papers were missing, even though the train had been authorised to pass through Romania by its Prime Minister.

In the movie, the train is stopped several days in the village of Căpâlniţa by the chief of the train station, Doiaru, who is corrupt and routinely steals goods from the trains which go through his station. He forces the train to move onto a siding until the paperwork is produced. The Americans try in vain to get the Romanian government to sort out the paperwork, but the responsibility is passed from one ministry to the other and as a result, their departure is delayed.

Periodic flashbacks take the audience back to Doiaru's childhood, when his parents, who were factory owners, awaited the coming of the Americans at the end of World War 2. As his father was considered a German supporter, Doiaru's family dreaded the arrival of the Russians. However, the Russians arrived first and they took away Doiaru's parents and he never saw them again. The first Americans to arrive in the village after the war are the very soldiers on the train in 1999.

The mayor of the village tries to make the Americans' stay enjoyable and invites them to the 100th anniversary of the founding of the village, even though such a feast was celebrated only a few months before. Doiaru's daughter, Monica, develops a crush on an American soldier, but as she knows no English, she uses the help of a local geek, Andrei, who is in love with her.

The mayor and the rest of the villagers are incited into revolting against Doiaru and start a riot, during the course of which the train leaves and Doiaru dies.

An ending note says that the radar was installed two hours after the ceasefire with Yugoslavia was signed, and the final scene shows Monica and Andrei meeting in Bucharest in 2004.

Reception
On review aggregator website Rotten Tomatoes, the film holds an approval rating of 89% based on 18 reviews, with an average rating of 6.90/10.

Keith Uhlich of Time Out New York named California Dreamin the third-best film of 2009.

The film also got a 3 out of 4 from Andrew Schenker of Slant Magazine.

Cast
Armand Assante as Captain Doug Jones
Jamie Elman as Sergeant David McLaren
Razvan Vasilescu as Doiaru
Maria Dinulescu as Monica
Alexandru Margineanu as Andrei
Ion Sapdaru as The Mayor
Alexandru Dragoi as Rodriguez
Andi Vasluianu as Soldier Marian

See also
Romanian New Wave

References

Further reading
Chivoiu, Oana (2011) “Cristian Nemescu's California Dreamin' (Endless): A Cinematic Radiography of a National Dream”, in: manycinemas 1, 54-65 Online pdf

External links

California Dreamin' (endless) at 2007 Cannes Film Festival

2000s Romanian-language films
2000s English-language films
English-language Romanian films
2007 films
2007 drama films
Films directed by Cristian Nemescu
Romanian drama films
Yugoslav Wars films
Works about the Kosovo War
2007 multilingual films
Romanian multilingual films